Greystone station is a commuter rail stop on the Metro-North Railroad's Hudson Line, located in the Greystone neighborhood of Yonkers, New York.

As of August 2006, daily commuter ridership was 513 and there are 250 parking spots.

History
Greystone station was originally built in 1899 by developer Charles Harriman as "Harriman station" for the New York Central and Hudson River Railroad, who insisted that he rename the station "Greystone" in 1910. A pedestrian bridge was built in 1915. As with many NYCRR stations in Westchester County, the station became a Penn Central station upon the merger between NYC and Pennsylvania Railroad in 1968, until it was taken over by Conrail in 1976, and then by Metro-North in 1983.

Station layout
The station has two high-level side platforms, each eight cars long.

References

External links 

 Entrance from Google Maps Street View
 Platforms from Google Maps Street View

Metro-North Railroad stations in New York (state)
Former New York Central Railroad stations
Transportation in Yonkers, New York
Railway stations in the United States opened in 1899
Railway stations in Westchester County, New York